Alan Keith Saunders (born February 1, 1947) is an American football coach who most recently served as the senior offensive assistant for the Cleveland Browns of the National Football League (NFL).

Personal life
Saunders was born in the north London suburb of Hendon as part of a sporting family; his great-uncle, Ron Saunders, played soccer for a number of teams in The Football League and later became a manager, winning honours with Norwich City and Aston Villa.

Saunders is a member of the San Jose State University Hall of Fame. He earned Academic All-American Football honors as a three-year starter and team captain at defensive back and wide receiver from 1966-68. He is a former prep All-American swimmer and National record holder in the sport as well as being an accomplished distance runner. He was veteran of numerous marathons and was crowned the Road Runners Club of America's Masters 5K National Champion in 1996. He is a member of Theta Chi Fraternity and has been enshrined in their Hall of Honor as well as receiving their "Distinguished Achievement Award" in 2016 for professional and life accomplishments. Saunders earned a master's degree in education from Stanford University in 1970.

Recognized in "Who's Who in America" and "International Leaders in Achievement", Saunders was awarded California's prestigious "Golden State Award" in 1989  for excellence in community service and leadership.

Saunders is married to the former Karen Mize, daughter of television personality and recording artist Billy Mize, a three-time winner of Academy of Country Music's Personality of the Year Award ('65-'67). Saunders has three children, distinguished clinical physiologist Dr. Korrin E. Saunders,  Emmy award winning film maker William J Saunders, and NFL coach Robert C. Saunders.

Coaching career
Prior to entering the NFL, Saunders spent 12 years as a college assistant coach. He began his coaching career as a graduate assistant at USC under John McKay from 1970–71 and served as receivers coach for the University of Missouri's Fiesta Bowl team in 1972.

Saunders spent 1973 through 1975 as play-caller and offensive backfield coach at Utah State where he coached Louie Giammona to become the NCAA leader in all purpose yardage and rushing in '74 and '75. He then spent six seasons as assistant head coach/offensive coordinator/quarterbacks coach at the University of California where he tutored All-American quarterbacks Joe Roth and Rich Campbell. He guided the Golden Bears to set 32 NCAA, conference and school records and finished each season ranked in the top ten in the nation in passing. His final collegiate stop was in 1982 as offensive coordinator/quarterbacks coach under Johnny Majors at the University of Tennessee where he built an explosive, record setting offense featuring future NFL first-round wide receiver picks Willie Gault and Clyde Duncan.

His first NFL head coaching position came with the San Diego Chargers as interim head coach in 1986 following the resignation of Don Coryell. He spent two full seasons as the Chargers head coach after previously working as receivers coach in 1983-84 and assistant head coach in 1985-86 for what was one of the most prolific offenses in the history of modern football. In 1985, San Diego's "Air Coryell" led the NFL in passing and total offense for an unprecedented fifth time in six years. Saunders tutored Hall of Fame receivers Charlie Joiner and Kellen Winslow and oversaw the development of Pro Bowl receivers Wes Chandler, Lionel James and Gary Anderson.

From 1989 until 1998, Saunders was with the Kansas City Chiefs. He served as the assistant head coach and wide receivers coach working with Pro Bowl performers Carlos Carson, Stephon Paige, Webster Slaughter, Andre Rison and Derek Alexander. Saunders worked for 10 winning seasons under the highly respected head coach Marty Schottenheimer.

After Schottenhiemer's unexpected resignation from the Chiefs, Saunders joined the St. Louis Rams coaching staff under the legendary Dick Vermeil. Serving as associate head coach and receivers coach with the Rams (1999-2000), he helped create one of the most dynamic and explosive offenses that the NFL had ever seen, and eventually helped lead the Rams to a Super Bowl XXXIV victory. Leading the NFL in virtually every significant offensive category, "The Greatest Show on Turf" established numerous NFL records for scoring and offensive production. The emergence of Hall of Fame quarterback Kurt Warner, the production of Hall of Fame running back, Marshall Faulk and Saunders’ development of Pro Bowlers Isaac Bruce and Torry Holt were all largely cited as the key factor in the Rams’ innovative and creative success.

When Vermeil came out of retirement in 2001, Saunders reunited with his old mentor and former team, the Kansas City Chiefs, as the assistant head coach/offensive coordinator until Vermeil’s final retirement in 2006. Under Saunders’ direction as coordinator, the Chiefs offense was the most productive unit in the entire NFL during that 5-year span. 46 franchise records for offense production were established and no team scored more points (2,175), gained more yards (30,470), or scored more touchdowns (262) during that time. Saunders offense also broke numerous NFL records including a single season record of 398 first downs, most combined first downs in a game (64), established the highest red zone touchdown scoring percentage in league history (77.8), longest touchdown pass in league history (99yds), fewest fumbles in a season (2), tied a 42-year-old mark with 63 rushing touchdowns over two seasons, became the first team in NFL history to have three runners have 150-yard games in a single season, and was the only team ever to score 8 rushing touchdowns in a single game.

Also during that period, Priest Holmes twice broke the NFL single season rushing touchdown record (27) and was named NFL offensive player of the year (2003). Additionally, Tony Gonzales set the NFL single season receiving mark for tight ends (102 in 2004), Trent Green became only the fourth player in league history to finish four consecutive seasons with a QB rating above 90, and 11 different offensive players enjoyed Pro Bowl years — all under Saunders’ direction. Saunders was ranked as the #1 Offensive Coordinator in the past 25 years in the NFL by ESPN and in 2005, and was named USA Today's Offensive Coach of the Year.

On January 19, 2006, he joined the coaching staff of the Washington Redskins as associate head coach and offensive coordinator to Hall of Fame coach Joe Gibbs. With one of the most dominant rushing teams in the league Saunders led Washington's offense to a playoff berth in 2007. Saunders served Gibbs until his retirement two years later.

On January 30, 2008, Saunders was hired as offensive coordinator for the St. Louis Rams. Constructing an offense around the skills of Pro Bowl running back Steven Jackson, the Rams had one of the most dominant rushing attacks in the NFL.

In 2009, Saunders was hired away by the Baltimore Ravens to serve as the senior offensive assistant to John Harbaugh. Saunders contributed to designing an offense that produced back to back playoff appearances for the Ravens and worked closely with pro bowl performers Todd Heap and Dennis Pitta.

On January 20, 2011, Saunders was hired by Al Davis and Hue Jackson to serve as the Offensive Coordinator and QB coach for the Oakland Raiders. Under Saunders' direction, Oakland's offense finished with the second highest yardage total in franchise history (6,072) and ranked among the NFL leaders in rushing, passing and total offense.

On January 31, 2012, following Davis' death and Jackson's firing, and after interviewing for several vacant offensive coordinator positions with other organizations, Saunders agreed to return to Oakland as Senior Offensive Assistant under Dennis Allen. He served in that capacity for the following three seasons.

Saunders announced his retirement on April 10, 2015, but returned on October 7 as the Miami Dolphins senior offensive assistant under interim coach Dan Campbell. While working primarily with the wide receivers Jarvis Landry set a franchise record with 110 receptions and became the most productive receiver in NFL history during his first two seasons with a total of 194.

On January 19, 2016, Saunders rejoined Jackson at the Cleveland Browns to be the team's senior offensive assistant. He additionally coached wide receivers, and turned former QB Terrelle Pryor into a 1,000 yard receiver in his first full season at the position. Saunders remained with the Browns until retiring after the 2018 NFL season.

Head coaching record

References

1947 births
Living people
American football safeties
American football wide receivers
Baltimore Ravens coaches
California Golden Bears football coaches
Kansas City Chiefs coaches
Missouri Tigers football coaches
San Diego Chargers coaches
San Diego Chargers head coaches
San Diego State Aztecs football coaches
San Jose State Spartans football players
St. Louis Rams coaches
Oakland Raiders coaches
Tennessee Volunteers football coaches
USC Trojans football coaches
Utah State Aggies football coaches
Washington Redskins coaches
National Football League offensive coordinators
Sportspeople from London
English players of American football
English emigrants to the United States
Miami Dolphins coaches
Cleveland Browns coaches